The 2021–22 Penn State Nittany Lions basketball team represented Pennsylvania State University in the 2021–22 NCAA Division I men's basketball season. They were led by first-year head coach Micah Shrewsberry and played their home games at the Bryce Jordan Center in University Park, Pennsylvania as members of the Big Ten Conference.

Previous season
In a season limited due to the ongoing COVID-19 pandemic, the Nittany Lions finished the 2020–21 season 11–14, 7–12 in Big Ten play to finish in a tie for 10th place. As the No. 10 seed in the Big Ten tournament, they defeated Nebraska before losing to Wisconsin in the second round.

On October 21, 2020, head coach Pat Chambers resigned after an internal investigation by the school into inappropriate conduct by Chambers. It had been reported in July that former player Rasir Bolton had left the program due to inappropriate comments to him by Chambers. New allegations surfaced after a later investigation by the school that led to Chambers resigning. Assistant coach Jim Ferry was named interim coach for the season.

Following the end of the season, the school hired Purdue assistant coach Micah Shrewsberry as head coach.

Offseason

Departures

Incoming transfers

Recruiting classes

2021 recruiting class
There were no incoming recruits for the class of 2021.

2022 recruiting class

Roster

Coaching Staff

Schedule and results
Games against VCU and Quinnipiac were canceled due to positive COVID-19 results within the PSU program.

|-
!colspan=9 style=|Regular season

|-
!colspan=9 style=|Big Ten tournament

Source

References

Penn State Nittany Lions basketball seasons
Penn State
Penn State